Thomas Sinclair (27 August 1897 – 13 March 1967), sometimes known as Topping Sinclair, was an English professional footballer who made over 300 appearances as a wing half in the Football League for Southport.

Career statistics

References

1897 births
1967 deaths
Footballers from Southport
English footballers
Association football wing halves
Southport F.C. players
Port Vale F.C. players
Macclesfield Town F.C. players
Nelson F.C. players
English Football League players